Lawrence Godfrey Burton (born December 15, 1951) is a former professional American football player and world-class Olympic sprinter, finishing fourth for the United States team in the 200 meter final at the 1972 Summer Olympic Games.  He held the world record in the 60-yard dash at 5.9 seconds.

As a Senior at Purdue University, he finished his season with 38 catches for 702 yards (18.5 YPR) and 4 TD.  He led the Big 10 in catches, receiving yards, and was 2nd in yards per reception.  He was named to numerous All-American teams.

Burton was selected by the New Orleans Saints in the first round (7th overall) of the 1975 NFL Draft; a wide receiver from Purdue University, he played in the NFL for five seasons for the Saints and the San Diego Chargers between 1975 and 1979. Despite having over 250 receiving yards in each of his first two seasons, he was never able to become a regular starter for any team.

Boys Town Career  
In 1980, Larry, along with his wife Ida, became Family Teachers at Boys Town located outside of Omaha, Nebraska.

In 1992, after being Family Teachers, Larry became the Director of the Long Beach Shelter, where he worked until 2008.

Larry said, "Many of the youth who come to our Long Beach Shelter are in crisis upon arrival.  This is a safety net for them.  Otherwise, their lives would be endangered for this is an emergency place."

The Burtons earned the Civic Leader Award, given by the National Academy of Sports and Athletics.

Personal 
In 2013, Burton was inducted into the Virginia Sports Hall of Fame.

He has 3 children, and Burton's grandsons, Clay and Trey, played football for the Florida Gators.
Trey is a tight end for the Indianapolis Colts, and has been for the Philadelphia Eagles, and the Chicago Bears.

References

External links
 pro-football-reference.com stats
 Sport Illustrated SI Vault December 21, 1992 

1951 births
Living people
People from Northampton County, Virginia
American male sprinters
Players of American football from Virginia
Track and field athletes from Virginia
American football wide receivers
Purdue Boilermakers football players
New Orleans Saints players
San Diego Chargers players
Athletes (track and field) at the 1972 Summer Olympics
Olympic track and field athletes of the United States
Track and field athletes in the National Football League